Colchester Zoo is a zoological garden situated near Colchester, England. The zoo opened in 1963 and celebrated its 50th anniversary on 2 June 2013. It is home to many rare and endangered species, including big cats, primates and birds as well as many invertebrates and fish species.

Animal exhibits

The animals habitats at Colchester Zoo are presented in a number of different themed zones.

Butterfly Glade
Opened in Spring 2015, Butterfly Glade is a walk through exhibit which is housed near Bears of the Rising Sun. It is home to many different species of butterflies, plants and flowers. It was opened in memory of Isobel Rose Parmenter who died in October 2014 from langerhans cell histiocytosis.

Australian Rainbows
Opened in summer 2014, Australian Rainbows is an exhibit that previously housed the Wild about Animals theatre. Inside the building is a waterfall, a large pond and colourful gardens. Visitors are able to journey through an aviary of rainbow lorikeets, with the opportunity to feed a treat of nectar to these colourful birds.

Koi Niwa
Within this exhibit there are two large pools housing a variety of koi. There are also two filtration systems visible to visitors. The exhibit is set in the style of a typical Japanese garden with statues, ornaments and waterfalls.

Walking Giants
Walking Giants opened in the summer of 2012 and is split into two sections. The complex houses three out of four of the world’s biggest tortoise species including Aldabra giant tortoises and African spurred tortoises.

Lost Madagascar
Opened in Easter 2012, Lost Madagascar is a walk-through enclosure that is home to troops of black-and-white ruffed lemurs, crowned lemurs, red-bellied lemurs and ring-tailed lemurs. The exhibit can only be accessed by taking a ride on the zoo's road train, known as the Lost Madagascar Express.

Otter Creek
Otter Creek was opened in August 2011 and houses a family of smooth-coated otters who are part of breeding programme around Europe, to help ensure there is a healthy population in captivity.

Wilds of Asia
Wilds of Asia is a group of enclosures housing various different species from across Asia. Among the species on display in Wilds of Asia are pileated gibbons, red pandas, wreathed hornbill, binturongs, Asian small-clawed otters, Burmese pythons and lion-tailed macaques.

Kingdom of the Wild
Kingdom of the Wild multi-species complex, which houses several different African species including reticulated giraffes, southern white rhinoceros, common ostriches and maneless zebras, while the indoor area features pygmy hippopotamuses, black-headed weavers, African rock pythons, aardvarks, rock hyraxes and various species of African reptiles, invertebrates and fish. There is also an aviary, 'Vulture Valley' which is home to Rüppell's vultures.

Elephant Kingdom
Elephant Kingdom is home to Colchester Zoo's herd of African bush elephants. It has a unique design which allows all the elephants maximum sight, sound and physical contact and has specially designed night stalls, a roped off "safe area" and spacious indoor bull elephant quarters.

Edge of Africa
Edge of Africa can be found within the far end of the zoo park, and houses grey crowned cranes, Kirk's dik-diks, blue cranes, blue duikers, cheetahs, spotted hyenas, mandrills, red river hogs and common warthogs in large outdoor areas.

Playa Patagonia
Opened in August 2003, Playa Patagonia is home to an all-female group of five South American sea lions named Atlanta, Milan, Winnipeg, Paris and Sydney. The enclosure also features the largest straight underwater tunnel in Europe, holding 500,000 gallons of water and with glass that is 10 millimetres thick.

Rajang's Forest
Rajang's Forest was renamed in memoru of Rajang, a hybrid orangutan who died at the age of 50 in 2018, having lived at the zoo since 1980. The enclosure is now currently home to three Bornean orangutans, a male named Tiga and two females, Mali and her daughter Tatau, who arrived from the Paignton Zoo.

Dragons of Komodo
Colchester Zoo is one of the few zoos in the UK approved to keep Komodo dragons and currently houses a number of komodo dragons and previously had breeding success within the EEP breeding programme for this species. The enclosure is designed to mimic conditions in the wild, and includes a large pool with showers, as well as a glass roof that can be drawn back to allow in sunlight.

Tiger Taiga
Tiger Taiga is large complex area home to three Amur tigers,  called Taiga, Anoushka and Tatana. With multiple areas, pools and a high viewing platform for the tigers as well as a viewing tunnel that runs through the enclosure leads viewers into the Nature Area.

Lion Rock
Opened in April 2004, Lion Rock houses a male lion named Bailey. The indoor area of Lion Rock features an enclosure housing fennec foxes.

Bears of the Rising Sun
This enclosure is home to a pair of sun bears, a male named Jo-Jo and a female named Srey Ya. Both bears were given to the zoo by the Rare Species Conservation Centre in 2010, after being confiscated by government anti-poaching patrols in Cambodia.

Leopards at Ussuri Falls
Opened in February 2010, this enclosure houses a male and female Amur leopard as well as their two offspring.

Inca Trail
Inca Trail is home to a large colony of Humboldt penguins, as well as a nearby enclosure with a troop of red-backed bearded sakis.

Suricata Sands
Opened in May 2009, Suricata Sands houses a mob of meerkats, including a breeding pair named Robin and Pippa.

Worlds Apart
Opened in May 2008, Worlds Apart consists of six enclosures, which include an open enclosure home to Fiji banded iguanas, rhinoceros iguanas, poison dart frogs, green anacondas and a walk-through exhibit that houses coppery titis, golden lion tamarins, Linnaeus's two-toed sloths, pied tamarins and a southern tamandua.

Chimp World
Revamped in 2013, a new larger Chimp World houses a group of seven chimpanzees, three males and four females. The dominant male of the troop is named Tombe. Located nearby are West African slender-snouted crocodiles.

Wallaby Walkabout
An Australia-themed walk-through enclosure that houses a group of Bennett's wallabies.

Medellin Monkeys
The Medellin Monkeys enclosure is home to one of the main groups of Colombian spider monkeys.

Heart of the Amazon
This complex is home to a large troop of common squirrel monkeys. The enclosures just outside Heart of the Amazon were previously home to both black and brown bears.

Iguana Forest and South American Walkthrough
The former walkthrough near the old orangutan exhibit houses a group of golden-headed lion tamarins, as well as Linnaeus's two-toed sloths. The adjoining Iguana Forest holds several green iguanas confiscated from airport customs and yellow-footed tortoises. Nearby is an enclosure for a troop of golden-bellied capuchins. This walkthrough also previously housed the zoo's lesser Malayan chevrotain.

Feathers of the Forest
A walkthrough habitat that features a few tropical bird species such as Victoria crowned pigeons and crested partridges.

Familiar Friends (Outdoor Area)
Outdoor area including donkeys, horses, llamas and alpacas. The Colenso Village is an African village-themed walkthrough  enclosure for several African breeds of goat and sheep, namely the African pygmy goats, Boer goats, Cameroon sheep and fat-tailed sheep. 

Call of the Wild
This exhibit is near the Wilds of Asia complex and as of December 2013 features three Eurasian wolves. They can be viewed from the Lost Madagascar Express train, and also from the glass viewing areas.

World of Wings
An aviary complex that houses three species of birds of prey, Andean condors, great grey owls and king vultures.

Other species
Other species found in the zoo include Barbary macaques, bush dogs, Chilean flamingos, collared mangabeys, Darwin's rheas, geladas, giant anteaters, L'Hoest's monkeys, Oxford Sandy and Black pigs, Visayan spotted deer and Visayan warty pigs.

Woolly Mammoth interactive display
In July 2016, the zoo opened a new augmented reality display that gives its visitors the chance to walk with digitally-recreated woolly mammoths. The attraction is located inside the elephant house and is believed to be the first of its kind in a UK zoo.

Conservation efforts 

The zoo has its own charity Action for the Wild to assist projects worldwide. It provides both financial and technical assistance, and aims to raise awareness among local people in community conservation programmes, as well as supporting conservation research around the world.

Since 2005, Action for the Wild has been working to set up the 6,000 hectare UmPhafa Private Nature Reserve in KwaZulu Natal, South Africa. Working to rehabilitate the land which was previously managed as separate cattle farms, to return it to a healthy state and to release native animal species back onto the reserve. Many species have been released; these species include zebra, nyala, giraffe, red hartebeest, blesbok, waterbuck, common reedbuck, blue wildebeest and ostrich.

Notable former exhibits

White Tiger Valley
This exhibit used to house Sasha, the zoo's well-known and loved white tiger. Sasha died on 15 December 2010 aged 15. The exhibit underwent extensive work, and re-opened as Lost Madagascar at Easter 2012.

Hornbill Hill
Hornbill Hill was a steep and narrow pathway that featured enclosures for Waldrapp ibis, southern ground hornbill, black hornbill, red-billed blue magpie and at the top of the hill there is an enclosure that has previously held snow leopard, fossa, giant anteater and various New World monkeys and an African aviary that normally holds purple gallinule, hamerkop, Von der Decken's hornbill and curlew. There is also a small hidden enclosure for Geoffroy's cat. The Hornbill Hill aviaries, Geoffroy's cat enclosure and part of the Medellin Monkeys exhibit have all been demolished to make way for the new sun bear enclosure.

Future plans
The zoo is currently devising plans to build a brand new tropical walk-through exhibit which will bring over seven new species to Colchester Zoo, including a brand new species of crocodile. The exhibit will be spread over two floors and will incorporate an underwater viewing tunnel in which visitors will be able to see crocodiles swim and feed above their heads, before coming out to see them basking around their outdoor pool on their heated rocks through three large glass windows.

The zoo is currently renovating an enclosure for its pride of lions. The next project will be to refurbish the hippo enclosure.

Cultural references

On television
The third series of the Channel 5 show Zoo Days came from Colchester Zoo. This series was presented by former Blue Peter star Konnie Huq, and began transmission on 9 June 2008 and ran for 4 weeks.

In books

In May 2013 a book called The History of Colchester Zoo was published. It was written by S.C.Kershaw.

On radio
The zoo's history, and various incidents of animals escaping, were featured in the BBC Radio 4 series Mark Steel's in Town, first broadcast in September 2016.

Images

References

Sources

Kershaw, S.C., The Story of Colchester Zoo, Stroud: The History Press, 2013

External links
 
 

Tourist attractions in Essex
Zoos in England
Buildings and structures in Colchester (town)
Zoos established in 1963